is a Japanese actress who is represented by the talent agency Staff-plus.

Biography
She graduated from the Toyo Eiwa Junior High and Senior High Part in Nihon University's Gei-jutsu Graduate Film School.

She performed in a high school musical, and in 2003 her acting debut was in the stage play Pure Love. In 2006, Ohwada served as an image model for the sports club Jexer.

On June 6, 2014, she married a friend from her high school.

On April 23, 2015, Ohwada announced in her blog that she was five months pregnant, after having a miscarriage two years earlier due to polycystic ovary syndrome.

Filmography

TV series

Films

References

External links
  
 Official profile 

Japanese actresses
1983 births
Living people
People from Tokyo